Claudinei Quirino da Silva (born November 19, 1970 in Lençóis Paulista) is a retired Brazilian sprinter who competed primarily in 200 metres.



Career

He has been successful on regional and world level, and won a 2000 Olympic silver medal with the Brazilian 4 x 100 metres relay team.

In 1999 he ran the 200m dash in 19.89 seconds, the former South American record.

At the 1997 World Championships in Athletics in Athens, Claudinei Quirino won the bronze medal in the 200 meters, with a time of 20s26; in 1999 World Championships in Athletics, in Sevilla, Spain he won silver in the 200 meters, with 20 seconds and bronze in the 4x100m.

At the 1999 Pan American Games in Winnipeg, he won gold in the 200 meters and 4x100m relay. Still in 1999, he won gold in the final stage of the IAAF Grand Prix, in 1999, in Munich, Germany, in the 200 meters race, with a time of 19s89.

Achievements 
(200 metres unless noted)

2003 South American Championships - silver medal
 2000 Olympic Games - silver medal (4x100 metres relay)
 2000 Olympic Games - sixth place
 1999 Pan American Games - gold medal (4x100 metres relay)
 1999 Pan American Games - bronze medal (100 m)
 1999 Pan American Games - gold medal
 1999 World Championships - silver medal
1999 South American Championships - gold medal (4x100 metres relay)
1997 South American Championships - gold medal (4x100 metres relay)
1997 South American Championships - gold medal
 1997 World Championships - bronze medal
 1995 World Championships - fifth place
1995 South American Championships - silver medal

References

External links
 

1970 births
Living people
Athletes (track and field) at the 1996 Summer Olympics
Athletes (track and field) at the 1999 Pan American Games
Athletes (track and field) at the 2000 Summer Olympics
Athletes (track and field) at the 2003 Pan American Games
Bobsledders at the 2006 Winter Olympics
Brazilian male bobsledders
Brazilian male sprinters
Olympic athletes of Brazil
Olympic bobsledders of Brazil
Olympic silver medalists for Brazil
Pan American Games athletes for Brazil
World Athletics Championships medalists
Pan American Games gold medalists for Brazil
Medalists at the 2000 Summer Olympics
Olympic silver medalists in athletics (track and field)
Pan American Games medalists in athletics (track and field)
Goodwill Games medalists in athletics
South American Games silver medalists for Brazil
South American Games medalists in athletics
Competitors at the 1994 South American Games
Competitors at the 1998 Goodwill Games
Medalists at the 1999 Pan American Games
Medalists at the 2003 Pan American Games
Sportspeople from São Paulo (state)